Skytop is an unincorporated community in Barrett Township, Monroe County, Pennsylvania, United States.  Located north of Mountainhome, it is accessible by local roads off Route 390.  Its elevation is 1,562 feet (476 m), and it is located at  (41.2278683, -75.2382360).  Although Skytop is unincorporated, it has a post office, with the ZIP code of 18357; the ZCTA for ZIP Code 18357 had a population of 87 at the 2000 census.

The town is home to the Skytop Lodge, a historic 1920s retreat hotel.

References

External links
Barrett Township Community Portal

Unincorporated communities in Monroe County, Pennsylvania
Unincorporated communities in Pennsylvania